Conatira (possibly from Aymara qhuna grind stone, tira cradle, "grind stone cradle") is a mountain in the Vilcanota mountain range in the Andes of Peru, about  high . It is situated in the Puno Region, Melgar Province, Nuñoa District. It lies southeast of the summit of Jonorana and southwest of Sachapata and Jarupata. The rivers Llancamayo and Jatun Mayo (Quenamari) which originate north and northeast of Conatira flow along its western, southern and eastern slopes.

References

Mountains of Puno Region
Mountains of Peru